Millett Field (also Millet Field) is the oldest, continuously used public park in Chehalis, Washington and is most noted as home to a Chehalis minor-league baseball team in the early 20th century. The ballfield was regularly used as the central hub of Chehalis sporting activity for decades, including hosting games for several Negro League teams in the 1920s. Located in the city's South Market district, one block north of the NRHP listed O. B. McFadden House, the  park began in 1898.

History

Millett Field began as a land donation to the city in 1898 from its namesake, Daniel Millett, a notable attorney and prior mayor of the city. After deeding the parcel, originally a business share of the Chehalis Land & Timber Company, Millett bought several surrounding tracts to increase the park's size. Instructions written in the original deed require the park to be used for "athletic and playground recreation types of activities".

Early years (1898–1907)

The park was kept in an undeveloped state by the city however residents used the land for local baseball games, including amateur competitions sponsored by local businesses.

The earliest recorded football game played at the park between the Chehalis and Centralia high schools, colloquially known as the "Swamp Cup" or "Thanksgiving Day Game", was in 1907. The Chehalis team would host the Swamp Cup from 1907 to 1915, then every other year until the early 1930s; Chehalis would never lose a football match to Centralia at Millett Field. Millett Field would be used as home turf for the Chehalis Bearcat's football team until 1932, moving to new grounds after flooding issues and the loss of the grandstand prohibited large crowds from attending the games.

Professional baseball era (1908–1949) 

An official grand opening took place on May 9, 1908, with a parade and a baseball game between the city of Chehalis and Centralia. The dedication was declared a public holiday in the city. In 1910, the field became host to the Chehalis Gophers baseball team after the establishment of the Class D level Washington State League minor league. The team would finish second in the six-team league, led by retired Chicago White Sox ballplayer, Fielder Jones. The team would be named the "Proteges" in 1911, finishing second. The 1912 season featured the team as the "Farmers", winning the Washington State League championship by ending the season in 1st place. The city, and the ballfield, has not hosted another minor league team since.

The ballpark would host the Timber League beginning in 1924, an independent and semi-pro baseball circuit that prior to its incorporation went under other monikers, such as the Southwest Washington League and the Lumber League. These semi-pro leagues began in the 1910s after the loss of the city's minor league team; the Timber League lasted until 1949. The Chehalis baseball teams would be named after various mascots during this time, most notably, "Moose".

The first Negro League team to play at the ballfield was in 1914 when the Colored Giants of Chicago played the Portland Colts. Negro League teams, most notably the Colored Giants of Tacoma, would compete at Millett Field throughout the 1920s. Barnstorming clubs, such as the Cuban House of David, and the House of David Bearded Beauties, played at Millett Field.

The park would be used for more than baseball and football. The outfield would be temporarily converted for track and field events in the 1910s and 1920s. Concrete tennis courts were built in the southeast section of the park in 1925. Various non-athletic events, such as military training, national and local celebrations, festivals, carnivals, and early Decoration Day observances would be held at Millett Field since its grand opening.

The field would be used often as a takeoff or landing strip for airplane exhibitions and stunts in the 1920s, often coinciding with July 4 celebrations or Chautauqua events. Gustav Stromer, an early Washington state aviator, used Millett Field to launch a biplane in 1914. Crashing on his first attempt, the repaired airplane was able to achieve flight on a second bid from the park. 

The grandstand was decimated by a large windstorm in 1932, with a total loss of the roof and severe damage to the seating area. It would be rebuilt in 1935, funded in part by local dances held to raise monies for the project.

Local ballpark years (1950–1979)

After the closing of the Timber League, baseball competitions were still held at the park into the 1970s, including amateur and semi-pro leagues, a local Babe Ruth League, girl's softball, and high school district tournaments. A Timber League revival began in 1954 though no further league games would be played at the ballpark after 1956.

A demand for lighting at the ballpark began in earnest in 1936 with local fundraisers being held to help pay the costs of the equipment. Despite continuing community efforts to raise funds, headway on the project did not emerge until 1952 when poles for the lighting were installed. The completed lighting of the field was celebrated with a dedication program in July 1953 after a strong final push to gather proceeds to complete the task.

Closure and repurpose (1979–present) 

After the construction of ballfields at Recreation Park (1954) and Stan Hedwall Park (1972) in Chehalis, use of Millett Field began to decline. The grandstand and bleachers were taken down in 1979 and the playing field eventually grew over. The ballfield area was fenced off and closed in the mid-1990s during an ecological cleanup of a nearby factory. The tennis courts became unkempt and an unauthorized but tolerated skate park was built on the concrete pads but was eventually removed in 2001. Nearby residents raised funds to convert the tennis courts to a fenced basketball court in the early 2000s, completing the project in 2004.  An attempt in 2006 to consider the land surplus for use as a flood mitigation tool did not materialize, however a playground area, built with the cooperation of a local fitness club and the city was unveiled that year.

A plaque on the tennis court enclosure, and one remaining light pole, are the only visible reminders of the field's baseball past.

Features

Millett Field had a grandstand with accompanying bleachers and the park was surrounded by a wooden fence. Three thousand people could attend ballgames when the park was first constructed, with 1,000 people able to sit in the grandstand, 500 in the bleachers, and an additional 1,500 around the fence line. The bleachers would be expanded in 1930 to seat an additional 500 more spectators and the rebuilt grandstand of 1935, though smaller in capacity than the previous stand, would accommodate up to six hundred spectators. The grandstand would be refurbished a final time in 1960. At various times in the first couple of decades of the ballfield, sections of the outfield would be temporarily reformed for local track and field events.

The park, as of 2022, is enclosed in a chain link fence. The old ballfield area is closed to all visitors, with the basketball courts and playground portion the only accessible points to Millett Field. The last remaining light pole stands in a grove of trees in the southwest corner, near where the ballfield's home plate would have been located.

Notes

See Also

 Chehalis Gophers
 Chehalis Gophers players
 Parks and recreation in Chehalis, Washington - for additional information on other baseball/softball fields in the city

References

Chehalis, Washington
Negro league baseball venues
1898 establishments in Washington (state)
Baseball venues in Washington (state)